Danie Dharma (born July 25, 1986) is a Singaporean bodybuilder and professional wrestler. He is the 2016 Mr. Singapore, 2017 Mr. Singapore Classic, 2017 Asian Championship Classic Physique winner and the 2023 NPC Worldwide Singapore Men's Bodybuilding winner. He performs under the ring name Destroyer Dharma at Singapore Pro Wrestling (SPW) and is a former SPW Singapore Champion and current SPW NBCB Champion in his third reign.

Early life 
Danie Dharma was born in Singapore on July 25, 1986. Dharma was severely bullied as a child, due to his small size and stature, and the fact that he was an ethnic minority, being the only Indian Singaporean in a majority Chinese Singaporean environment. In order to prevent being further bullied, Dharma took up bodybuilding in 2001.

Bodybuilding career 
After being bullied as a child, Dharma took up bodybuilding in 2001. From 2005 to 2010, Dharma would win various local bodybuilding competitions. During 2012 to 2016, Dharma won four Singapore National Bodybuilding Championships. In 2016, Dharma would win the title of Mr. Singapore. Dharma won the inaugural Mr. Singapore Classic competition in 2017. During 2017, Dharma won the Asian Championship Classic Physique. In 2018, Dharma was a finalist of the Singapore Men's Health Cover Guy contest. During 2018, Dharma would also win the World Regional Championships Classic Physique Class B Category. In 2023, Dharma would make a return to bodybuilding after a long hiatus due to him pursuing his professional wrestling career and Covid-19. He competed in the NPC Worldwide Singapore Showdown in February of 2023, where he was crowned light heavyweight and overall winner in men's bodybuilding.

Professional wrestling career

Singapore Pro Wrestling (2016-present) 
Dharma made his debut in 2016, to aid "The Statement" Andruew Tang, in his match against Cima. Later that year, Dharma made his in-ring debut under the ring name, Destroyer Dharma, where he beat Rowdy Ranga. Dharma would go on to be the "muscle" for the faction Onslaught, which previously consisted of Tang and Kaiser Trexxus. In 2018, Dharma wrestled in a charity event for Singapore's migrant workers. In July 2019, Dharma was attacked by Da Butcherman, at a local gym, in a publicity stunt. During July, Dharma defeated Aiden Rex and Butcherman in a three way match to win the SPW Singapore Championship, becoming its 5th champion. 

In November 2019, Dharma participated in a three way match against Black Arrow, and Butcherman, where he would lose the Singapore Championship to Butcherman. His feud continued as he lost to Butcherman, for the second time, in a no-disqualification match. At SPW Prove: Alive & Kicking #1, Dharma would turn on Onslaught, teaming with Aiden Rex to defeat Tang and Trexxus. In July 2022, Dharma would team with BGJ to defeat CIMA and Issei Onitsuka. In October, Dharma would win the NBCB Battle Royal to become the inaugural SPW NBCB Champion. At SPW X: Astronomical Anniversary Day 1, Dharma would lose the NBCB belt to Kelly Kimberly. He would pin her after the match to win back his championship. On Day 2, Dharma would lose his title to Meta. Later that night, Dharma would defeat BGJ to win the NBCB Championship for the third time.

Personal life 
From 2006 to 2016, Dharma served in the Republic of Singapore Navy as a Weapon Control Specialist. Dharma is also a personal trainer.

Championships and accomplishments

Bodybuilding 

 Muscle Storm 2006 below 70 kg category Champion 
 Muscle Explosion I 2007 below 21years old Champion 
 Muscle Explosion II 2009 below 70 kg Champion 
 Muscle Explosion III 2010 Junior above 70 kg Champion 
 Muscle Explosion III 2010 Classic above 170 cm Champion 
 Singapore National Bodybuilding Championships 2012 below 75 kg Champion 
 Singapore National Bodybuilding Championships 2012 Classic above 165 cm Champion 
 Singapore National Bodybuilding Championships 2015 Men's open below 80 kg Champion 
 Singapore National Bodybuilding Championships 2016 Men's open below 85 kg Champion 
 Mr. Singapore 2016 
 Mr. Singapore Classic 2017 
 Asian Championship Classic Physique 2017 
 World Regional Championships Classic Physique Class B Category 2018 
 NPC Worldwide Singapore Men's Bodybuilding Light Heavyweight 2023 Winner 
 NPC Worldwide Singapore Men's Bodybuilding 2023 Overall Winner

Professional Wrestling 
 Singapore Pro Wrestling
 SPW Singapore Championship (1 time) 
 SPW NBCB Championship (3 times, current)

References 

Living people
1986 births
Singaporean male professional wrestlers
21st-century professional wrestlers